Shater may refer to:

Shater, Lorestan, Iran
Shater, West Azerbaijan, Iran